Alex Barnett (born 1972) is an applied mathematician and musician who is a senior mathematician at the Flatiron Institute and professor of mathematics at Dartmouth College.

Barnett is also a jazz and funk musician.  He has composed the music for a number of films by his wife, director Liz Canner.

Career
His high frequency eigenfunction calculations  are some of the fastest in the world. He attended Cambridge University and received his Ph.D in theoretical physics from Harvard University.  He has written on topics such as efficient and accurate computational methods for waves, PDE eigenvalue problems, periodic problems, and quantum chaos. He has also done research on mathematical ecology and inverse problems in medical imaging.

Barnett was on the faculty at Dartmouth for twelve years before becoming a full professor in 2017. He was the third person hired at the Flatiron Institute and is currently a senior mathematician there.

Recognition
Barnett won First Prize in the XXI International Physics Olympiad, The Hockins Prize,  The Kennedy Scholarship, The Karen E. Wetterhahn Memorial Award for Distinguished Creative or Scholarly Achievement, Jeffe Fellowship and The Harold T. White Prize.

References 

Living people
English mathematicians
Harvard Graduate School of Arts and Sciences alumni
1972 births
Alumni of the University of Cambridge
Dartmouth College faculty